Cyperus vandervekenii is a species of sedge that is native to parts of Rwanda.

See also 
 List of Cyperus species

References 

vandervekenii
Plants described in 2006
Flora of Rwanda